Bắc Trà My is a district (huyện) of Quảng Nam province in the South Central Coast region of Vietnam. The district is known for its production of Saigon Cinnamon. As of 2003 the district had a population of 21,139. The district covers an area of 823 km2. The district capital lies at Trà My.

References

Districts of Quảng Nam province